Dorchester Bay may refer to:
Dorchester Bay (Boston Harbor), Massachusetts
Dorchester Bay (Nunavut), Canada